Stenje is a village in the Resen Municipality of North Macedonia. It is located on the shore of Lake Prespa, near the Macedonian-Albanian border and Galičica National Park. Today, the village has 438 inhabitants.

Demographics
As of the most recent national census in 2002, Stenje has an ethnically homogeneous population of Macedonians. The village is also one of only four in the municipality to have gained population from the 1994 census to the latest one.

All but one of the villagers declared Macedonian to be their mother tongue.

Religion
All of Stenje's residents identified as Macedonian Orthodox in the previous census. The village has four churches including the Church of St Atanas, the Church of Ss Cyril and Methodius, the Church of St Nicholas, and the Church of the Presentation of the Holy Mother of God.

People from Stenje 
Stojan Georgiev (? - 1922), revolutionary and member of the Internal Macedonian Revolutionary Organization

References

Villages in Resen Municipality